Kannan is a Tamil male given name. Due to a Tamil tradition of using patronymic surnames, it may also be a surname for males and females. The name is derived from the Hindu god Krishna, who is offered the epithet of Kannan in Tamil, meaning, "the one who is to be seen".

Etymology 
The word Kannan might come from the Pali into Tamil during the classical period. In Pali, Kanha means dark or black, and the Sanskrit equivalent will be Kṛṣṇa (Krishna). In Tamil-speaking regions, Lord Krishna is called as Kanna(or with a masculine ending Kannan).

Notable people

Given name
 B. Kannan, Indian cinematographer
 K. Kannan, Singaporean footballer
 Kannan (music director), Indian film music composer
 Kannan Balakrishnan (born 1964), Indian musician
 Kannan Iyer, Indian film writer and actor
 Kannan Soundararajan, Indian mathematician
 M. Kannan, Indian politician
 P. Kannan, Indian politician from Tamil Nadu
 P. Kannan , Indian politician from Puducherry        
 R. Kannan (born 1975), Indian film director
 S. P. Kannan, Indian politician
 Srirangam Kannan (born 1952), Indian musician
 Vedham Puthithu Kannan, Indian filmmaker

Surname
 Biju C. Kannan, Indian film director
 Beena Kannan (born 1960), Indian businesswoman
 Bharathi Kannan (born 1962), Indian film director
 Embar Kannan (born 1975), Indian musician
 Kanal Kannan, Indian film choreographer
 Ravi Kannan R Indian oncologist and Padma Shri awardee
 Ravindran Kannan (born 1953), Indian computer scientist
 Siddharth Kannan, Indian broadcaster
 Yaar Kannan, Indian film director

Other uses

Films
 Kannan En Kadhalan, 1968 Tamil film
 Kannan Varuvaan, 2000 Tamil film

Places
 Kannan Devan Hills, village in Kerala, India

See also

References

Tamil masculine given names